Administratively, Cuba is divided into 15 provinces and one special municipality (the Isla de la Juventud). The last modification was approved in August 2010 (by the Cuban National Assembly), splitting Havana province into two new provinces: Artemisa (which incorporates the three eastern municipalities of the neighbour Pinar del Río) and Mayabeque. The new provinces started functioning from January 1, 2011. Havana City Province (Ciudad de La Habana) recovered its original name: La Habana (Havana in English).

List of provinces 

From west to east, Cuba's provinces are:
 Pinar del Río
 Artemisa
 La Habana
 Mayabeque
 Matanzas
 Cienfuegos
 Villa Clara
 Sancti Spíritus
 Ciego de Ávila
 Camagüey
 Las Tunas
 Granma
 Holguín
 Santiago de Cuba
 Guantánamo
 Isla de la Juventud ("special municipality")

History 

The provinces were created in 1879 by the Spanish colonial government. From 1879 to 1976, Cuba was divided into 6 provinces, which maintained with little changes the same boundaries and capital cities, although with modifications in official names. These "historical" provinces are the following (from west to east):
 Pinar del Río
 La Habana, included the city of Havana, current Mayabeque, some municipalities of current Artemisa Province (prior to 1970: 5 municipalities; from 1970 to 2011, 8 municipalities, including Artemisa city itself). Isla de Pinos ("Isle of Pines"), known as Isla de la Juventud ("Island of Youth") since the 1970s, was considered a "special municipality" in the Province of La Habana.
 Matanzas
 Las Villas (before 1940 named "Santa Clara"), contained the present-day provinces of Cienfuegos, Villa Clara, Sancti Spíritus, and Southern Matanzas Province.
 Camagüey (before 1899 named "Puerto Príncipe"), contained the present-day provinces of Camagüey and Ciego de Ávila, as well as two municipalities of current Las Tunas Province (prior to 1970).
 Oriente (before 1905 named "Santiago de Cuba"), contained the present-day provinces of Las Tunas, Granma, Holguín, Santiago de Cuba and Guantánamo

Demographics 
Pop. = Population. Source: Cuba census 2002

Presidents of the People's Power Provincial Councils 
The following are the presidents of the Provincial People's Councils in each province in the country (local governments).

The Provincial People's Councils replaced the Provincial Assemblies in the 2019 Constitution and are made up of provincial representatives elected by the municipal assemblies or councils.

See also 

 Politics of Cuba
 Demographics of Cuba
 List of places in Cuba
 Municipalities of Cuba
 List of Caribbean First-level Subdivisions by Total Area
 ISO 3166-2:CU

References

External links 
 Cuba at GeoHive
 

 
Subdivisions of Cuba
Cuba, Provinces
Cuba 1
Provinces, Cuba
Cuba geography-related lists